Asma Rani is a judoka from Pakistan.

Career

National 
Rani represents Pakistan Army in national competitions. At the National Games held in Peshawar in November 2019, she won gold in the -57 kg event.

International 
In November 2018, Rani was included in the 5 member women's team and 19 member Pakistan team, sent to compete at the Commonwealth Judo Championships held in Jaipur, India. At the South Asian Games held in Kathmandu, Nepal in December 2019, she along with her teammates: Hamid Ali, Shah Hussain Shah, Qaiser Khan, Karamat Butt, Mohammad Hasnain, Nadeem Akram, Amina Toyoda, Humaira Ashiq and Beenish Khan won a silver medal in the mixed team event.

Events competed in:

 Commonwealth Judo Championships: 2018
 South Asian Games: 2019

References 

Living people
South Asian Games silver medalists for Pakistan
South Asian Games medalists in judo
Year of birth missing (living people)